John Morgan (18 August 1889 – 1983) was a Scottish professional footballer who made nearly 250 appearances in the Football League playing for Birmingham, Doncaster Rovers, Bristol City, Barrow, Walsall and Southport. He played as a half back.

Morgan was born in Penicuik, Midlothian. He began his football career with Edinburgh Emmett and then came to England to sign for Birmingham of the First Division in August 1924. He played only once for Birmingham, deputising for the injured Jimmy Cringan and his regular understudy Bill Hunter at centre half in a 4–0 defeat at Sunderland on 6 September 1924. After a brief spell in non-league football with Redditch Town he settled at Doncaster Rovers, where he played 150 Third Division North games in four seasons. After one Second Division game in one-and-a-half seasons for Bristol City, a return to the Third with Barrow offered more playing time. Short spells with Walsall and Southport and a venture to Ireland with Brideville preceded a return to non-league football in the English Midlands with Worcester City and Atherstone Town.

Morgan died in 1983 aged 93 or 94.

References

1889 births
1983 deaths
People from Penicuik
Scottish footballers
Association football midfielders
Birmingham City F.C. players
Redditch United F.C. players
Doncaster Rovers F.C. players
Bristol City F.C. players
Barrow A.F.C. players
Walsall F.C. players
Southport F.C. players
Worcester City F.C. players
Atherstone Town F.C. players
English Football League players
Date of death missing
Place of death missing
Sportspeople from Midlothian